Poyen is a town in Grant County, Arkansas, United States. The population was 290 at the 2010 census. It is part of the Central Arkansas region.

Geography
Poyen is located in western Grant County at  (34.323459, -92.640487). U.S. Route 270 passes through the center of town, leading east  to Sheridan, the county seat, and west  to Malvern.

Demographics

As of the census of 2000, there were 272 people, 106 households, and 82 families residing in the town. The population density was 1,105.6 inhabitants per square mile (420.1/km). The racial makeup of the town was 95.23% White, 1.84% Black or African American, 0.74% Native American, 1.47% from other races, and 0.74% from two or more races.  1.84% of the population were Hispanic or Latino of any race.

There were 106 households, out of which 33.0% had children under the age of 18 living with them, 58.5% were married couples living together, 14.2% had a female householder with no husband present, and 22.6% were non-families. 21.7% of all households were made up of individuals, and 11.3% had someone living alone who was 65 years of age or older.  The average household size was 2.57 and the average family size was 2.99.

In the town, the population was spread out, with 25.7% under the age of 18, 7.7% from 18 to 24, 29.8% from 25 to 44, 25.0% from 45 to 64, and 11.8% who were 65 years of age or older.  The median age was 36 years. For every 100 females, there were 100.0 males.  For every 100 females age 18 and over, there were 90.6 males.

The median income for a household in the town was $30,625, and the median income for a family was $37,500. Males had a median income of $27,813 versus $20,313 for females. The per capita income for the town was $13,835.  About 2.8% of families and 4.3% of the population were below the poverty line, including 5.1% of those under the age of eighteen and 3.6% of those 65 or over.

Education 
Public education for early childhood, elementary and secondary school students is provided by the Poyen School District, which leads to graduation from Poyen High School.

Notable person
Country music singer Justin Moore is a native and currently resides in Poyen, Arkansas.

References

Towns in Grant County, Arkansas
Towns in Arkansas
Little Rock–North Little Rock–Conway metropolitan area